The 2016 Monaco GP2 Series round was a pair of motor races held on 27 and 28 May 2016 at the Circuit de Monaco, Monte Carlo, Monaco as part of the GP2 Series. It was the fourth round of the 2016 GP2 Series and was run in support of the 2016 Monaco Grand Prix. The first race, a 40-lap feature event, was won by Russian Time driver Artem Markelov after starting from 15th position. Norman Nato finished in second for Racing Engineering and MP Motorsport's Oliver Rowland took third. Nobuharu Matsushita for ART Grand Prix won the following day's 30-lap sprint race from pole position with Carlin's Marvin Kirchhöfer and Markelov's teammate Raffaele Marciello second and third.

Sergey Sirotkin won the pole position for the feature race by posting the fastest lap in qualifying but a slow start off the grid allowed Nato into the lead. Nato pulled away from the rest of the field and led for the majority of the race until a virtual safety car caught him out in the event's closing laps. Markelov was the main beneficiary of this and he made his mandatory pit stop to change tyres on the penultimate lap and held off Nato to take his maiden GP2 Series win. Matsushita started from pole position in the sprint race and repelled a challenge from the fast-starting Kirchhöfer to his right at the start. In a processional race, Matsushita opened out a 13.6 second lead over Kirchhöfer to win for the second time in GP2.

The results of the round meant Nato took the lead of the Drivers' Championship by one point over feature race winner Markelov. Alex Lynn maintained third place with 41 points with Pierre Gasly and Marciello fourth and fifth. In the Teams' Championship, Russian Time moved from fourth to first and Racing Engineering were eleven points behind but they retained second place. The leaders of the Teams' Championship enterin the event DAMS dropped to third while Prema Racing fell to fourth with eight rounds left in the season.

Background

The 2016 Monaco GP2 Series round was the second of eleven scheduled events of the 2016 GP2 Series season. It was held on 27 and 28 May 2016 at the Circuit de Monaco in Monaco and supported the 2016 Monaco Grand Prix. Tyre supplier Pirelli brought two types of tyre to the race: two dry compounds (super soft "options" and soft "primes"). The drag reduction system (DRS) had one activation zone for the race: on the start/finish straight linking Anthony Noghes and Sainte Devote turns. There were 11 teams of 2 drivers each entered for the race for a total of 22 participants and each driver used the Dallara GP2/11 vehicle.

Before the race, Prema Racing driver Pierre Gasly led the Drivers' Championship with 33 points, seven ahead of Norman Nato of Racing Engineering in second, who in turn, was a further four points in front of third-placed Alex Lynn for Russian Time. DAMS' Nicholas Latifi and Russian Time racer Artem Markelov were both tied for fourth with 20 points each. DAMS and Racing Engineering jointly led the Teams' Championship with 43 points each; Prema Racing stood in third position with 31 points and held a one-point gap over the fourth-placed Russian Time. Carlin were fifth with ten points.

Practice and qualifying

One 45-minute practice session was held on Thursday. The start of the session was moved forward five minutes following repairs to a drain cover that was dislodged during the first Monaco Grand Prix practice session by Nico Rosberg and struck by Jenson Button. Sergey Sirotkin (ART Grand Prix) was fastest with a lap of 1 minute, 20.361 seconds, almost one-tenth of a second faster than Nato in second. Lynn, Arthur Pic, Jordan King (Racing Engineering), Mitch Evans (Campos Racing), Gasly, Raffaele Marciello (Russian Time), Oliver Rowland (MP Motorsport) and Markelov occupied positions three to ten. Gasly ran wide at Sainte Devote corner, colliding with an outside barrier, and removing his front-left wheel. The virtual safety car (VSC) system was enabled to allow marshals to extricate his car from the track. Soon after, Nobuharu Matsushita (ART Grand Prix) locked his tyres on the run to the same corner and went straight into the wall. Daniël de Jong (MP Motorsport) oversteered into the Sainte Devote barrier and Sean Gelael (Campos Racing) ended the session early when he stalled his car and triggered a traffic holdup.

Thursday's afternoon's qualifying session ran for 30 minutes. Qualifying was divided into two groups of 13 cars to avoid overcrowding. Odd numbered vehicles were drawn in Group A and the even numbered cars were put in Group B. The drivers' fastest lap times determined the starting order for the first race. The pole position winner took four points for the Drivers' and Teams' Championships. The second group was competitive because eight drivers temporarily claimed pole position. Sirtokin clinched his maiden GP2 Series pole position with a time of 1 minute, 19.186 seconds, which was recorded in the session's closing period. He was joined on the grid's front row by Nato whose lap was seven-tenths of a second slower in the final seconds of Group A. Nato's teammate King qualified in third, Evans fourth, and Rowland fifth. Lynn, Antonio Giovinazzi (Prema Racing), Marciello, Latifi and Luca Ghiotto (Trident) rounded out the top ten qualifiers.

Pic was the fastest driver not to qualify in the top ten; his fastest time was nearly 1.2 seconds off Sirotkin's pace. He was followed by Matsushita and Marvin Kirchhöfer (Carlin) and Gelael in 12th to 14th. 15th-place qualifier Markelov misjudged his approach to Sainte Devote corner, locked his car's tyres, went airborne after driving over the kerbing and ran straight into a barrier. The wall was separated into two halves, stopping the session for 20 minutes while it was repaired. Markelov was unhurt. Gustav Malja (Rapax), Philo Paz Armand (Trident), de Jong and Jimmy Eriksson (Arden International) filled positions 16 to 19. Gasly had a car brake failure and entered the pit lane but missed the weighbridge when requested to enter the area. Gasly was required to start the feature event from the pit lane. Sergio Canamasas (Carlin) was judged to have made the same error and Nabil Jeffri (Arden International) was observed to block Markelov and both drivers were required to start from the pit lane. Jeffri could not take his penalty as he qualified 22nd. Since he could not take his three-place grid penalty, Jeffri began from the pit lane.

Qualifying classification
Group A

Group B

Notes
  — Pierre Gasly and Sergio Canamasas started from the pit lane having failed to stop at the scrutineering weighbridge.
  — Nabil Jeffri received a three-place grid penalty after being found guilty of impeding Artem Markelov during Group B's qualifying session. However, since Jeffri could not take his penalty in full, he started from the pit lane.

Races
The first ten finishers scored points, with two given to the fastest lap holder. The grid for the second race was determined by the finishing order of the first but with the first eight drivers in reverse order of where they finished. The top eight finishers earned points towards their respective championships.

Feature race
Sirotkin made a slow start, allowing fellow front-row starter Nato to brake later than him and claim the lead into Sainte Devote corner. Sirtokin then repelled a challenge from King over second place. The field avoided incident on the first lap and the top three of Sirotkin, Nato and King pulled away from the fourth-placed Evans over the next few laps. On lap six, the first mandatory pit stops to change tyres were made by Giovinazzi, Ghiotto, Pic and Kirchhöfer in the lower end of the order. Meanwhile, Nato set consecutive fastest laps to give himself a lead of 1.2 seconds over Sirotkin at the start of lap 10. King was distanced by Nato and Sirotkin by lap 11 as Sirotkin made an error and cut the Novelle Chicane, losing time. Rowland was challenging the slower Evans who straight-lined the Novelle Chicane at the exit of the tunnel to keep the position. Evans was subsequently issued a five-second time penalty on the 20th lap after the stewards deemed him to have gained an illegal advantage.

Meanwhile, another VSC was triggered on lap 18 when Gasly was trying to recover ground and mounted the back of Eriksson's car at La Racasse corner, which would ultimately result in Eriksson's retirement and debris was left on the track. Gasly was consequently forced to enter the pit lane to have his front wing replaced. The VSC was soon lifted after the debris was cleared from the circuit. At the restart, Rowland quickly displaced Evans and charged after the leading trio of Nato, Sirotkin and King. More drama came on lap 23 when Latifi was battling Markelov for seventh and got distracted. This caused Latifi to clip the barrier alongside the circuit in the tunnel and retired in the pit lane with a bent front-left suspension. Then, as Sirotkin was quickly catching Nato, his car got into an uncontrolled sideways manoeuvre after clipping the kerb too hard at the exit of La Piscine turn and hit the wall for the second successive feature race. Another VSC was activated to allow for general cleanup and racing resumed on lap 24. On the next lap, a third VSC was required when Jeffri crashed at La Rascasse corner. The VSC was lifted on lap 26. Competitive action lasted for three laps until a fourth VSC came about after King struck the barrier; he drove to the pit lane to retire.

Markelov moved into the lead when Lynn, Rowland and Evans pitted over laps 29 and 31 as Nato's pit crew were slow installing his front-right wheel. Markelow set faster lap times than anyone else despite being on heavily worn tyres. The VSC was used twice more for separate incidents that Ghiotto caused on lap 36 as he left debris on the racing line and hit the inside barrier at the Loews hairpin. Markelov was the main beneficiary of this as he was 15 seconds ahead of Nato. He was quicker than Nato in the tunnel and Tabac turn while his rivals' pace was limited since they were slower in the tighter corners. After the restart, Markelov made his mandatory pit stop on lap 39 to switch onto the super soft tyres, emerging just ahead of Nato who could not overtake Markelov on his out-lap. Because the five VSCs elongated the race, the number of laps was lowered to 40 from 42. Markelov's fresher tyres allowed him to hold off Nato in the last two laps for his maiden GP2 Series victory by 1 seconds. Third was Rowland and the rest of the provisional order consisting of Lynn, Evans, Marciello, Giovinazzi, Kirchhöfer, Matsushita, de Jong, Pic, Canamasas, Gelael, Malja, Gasly and Armand. After the race, Giovinazzi and Malja received five-second time penalties for illegally cutting the Novelle Chicane and Sainte Devote corner, respectively, handing the sprint race pole position from Kirchhöfer to Matsushita.

Feature race classification
Drivers who scored championship points are denoted in bold.

Notes
  — Antonio Giovinazzi and Gustav Malja received a five-second time penalty for gaining an advantage by way of leaving the circuit.

Sprint race

Sirtokin's team changed the monocoque on his car after his crash in the feature race. On the grid, Matsushita had a slow initial getaway and the second-placed Kirchhöfer was faster and drew alongside into Sainte Devote corner. However, Kirchhöfer did not move into the lead as Matsushita held him off by staying on the right and out-braking him. Behind the duo, Maricello went defensive against the fast-starting Evans and Nato went to the outside of Rowland to overtake him but he could not pass Lynn as the field were approaching Casino corner. From there on, the race settled into a rhythm as Matsushita opened his lead over Kirchhöfer to three seconds. Yellow flags were briefly waved by course officials on the fourth lap as King was about to pass Armand for 18th but he left the latter without enough space to get by and put him into a wall at the Loews hairpin. King incurred a five-second time penalty for causing the incident. On lap nine, further disruption was caused when Gelael slid wide at Sainte Devote and crashed into a barrier which activated the VSC.

Sirotkin's poor season continued when the on-board fire extinguisher in his car was activated by debris from his tyre at the entry to Massenet turn on the 11th lap. Sirotkin's visibility was greatly hindered by foam on his visor and he stopped on the escape road at Casino Square corner and retired. At the front, Kirchhöfer took a second out of Matsushita's lead under the VSC only for the latter to respond by being six seconds by lap 15. It further grew as the race progressed and Kirchhöfer was left to holding off third-placed Maricello. Nato and Matsushita traded the fastest lap as the laps passed by with the accolade being claimed by Matsushita on lap 28 with a time of 1 minute and 21.554 seconds and earned him two championship points. In a processional race, it was Matsushita's victory, achieving his second win in the GP2 Series after the 2015 Hungaroring feature race, and ensuring four different drivers had won all four of the season's races held at the time. Kirchhöfer finished 13.660 seconds later in second in Carlin's first podium since Felipe Nasr at the 2014 Abu Dhabi Sprint race and Maricello completed the podium in third. Off the podium, Evans took fourth and fifth-placed Alex Lynn led a pack of cars comprising Nato, Rowland and Markelov who were covered by 1.3 seconds in positions six through eight. The final classified finishers were Pic, Canamasas, de Jong, Malja, Gasly, Ghiotto, Eriksson, King, Jeffri and Giovinazzi who stalled on the grid.

Sprint race classification
Drivers who scored championship points are denoted in bold.

Post-round
The top three drivers in both races appeared on the podium to collect their trophies and spoke to the media in separate press conferences. Markelov was delighted to achieve his first win and stayed on the soft compound tyres because his team deemed their pace decent, "We really did a good job together. To finish P1 in Monaco and score my first victory in GP2, it’s amazing… I don’t have any other words. I’m really happy." Nato, who came second, stated that he was displeased and angry over seeing Markelov take the lead as he did not feel the need to change tyres and was urged by his engineer to pressure him, "I tried to overtake him before Turn 5 and when I saw I couldn’t do it, I just focused on the end of the race. P2 is better than nothing. This race was for us today but it’s still good points for the team and the drivers’ standings." Rowland said he was pleased to finish third and complimented his team, "It was a pretty good day. It was just a bit strange when Artem came out first. I didn’t expect that!"

After the sprint race, Matsushita called his Monaco sprint race victory "even more special" than other circuits and said tyre degradation was low as he focused on the race, "I’m happy to come home with a trophy, a victory here and some good points for the team. It was my first win in Monaco so it feels special. I led the whole race, I felt good in the car so I’m just really happy." Kirchhöfer spoke of his enjoyment racing at Monaco for the first time and had not anticipated achieving a podium result at the track, "I’m really happy with P2. I had a good gateway at the start but I couldn’t overtake Matsushita at the first corner. After that, I was thinking to bring the car home. But we are all happy, me and the team, with this result. There’s more to come!" Third-placed Marciello called his race "boring" because he found it difficult to overtake Kirchhöfer and hoped for a safety car or an extended VSC. Nevertheless, he said he was still happy and wanted to continue the form into the Baku round, "It’s still a good weekend with Artem’s P1 yesterday and my podium today but we need to improve during the qualifying. Our car is really good in the long runs and we have good pace. So our goal is to improve during the qualifying session."

The technical director of Racing Engineering Sébastien Viger explained his team visited the stewards for several hours after the feature race to understand how Nato lost the chance to win, "This showed how wrong things went for us with the multiple virtual safety cars. Basically, Markelov was very lucky as he took the VSC on slow zones [of the track] where he was not losing time and Norman and others took it on fast zones, which resulted in huge time losses." Despite the VSC allowing Markelov to increase his advantage, Svetlana Strelnikova, the team principal of Russian Time, said she felt they were within the regulations, "We led by 15 seconds [over Nato], but the question is 'where did the other 15 seconds come that we could stop and rejoin first?'. But there was VSC – six seconds to turn it off, six seconds to turn it on, and each driver reacts in a different way – they press the button at the moment that the engineer says on the radio and the car is running full speed again." Valentin Khorounzhiy of motorsport.com wrote that the changes in gap were unlikely to account for Markelov's reaction time but for where on the track the VSC was activated as some drivers slowed to a different extent. He noted suggestions of protesting Markelov's victory would be unsuccessful.

Nato left Monaco as the leader of the Drivers' Championship with 49 points and Markelov's feature race victory moved him to second with just one point separating the two. Lynn's results allowed him to maintain third with 41 points while previous championship leader Gasly fell to fourth with 33 and Marciello was fifth with 28. In the Teams' Championship, Russian Time moved from fourth to take the lead with 76 points and Racing Engineering retained second with 65 points. DAMS' results dropped them to third while Prema Racing maintained their hold on fourth. Carlin were still in fifth with eight rounds left in the season.

Standings after the round

Drivers' Championship standings

Teams' Championship standings

 Note: Only the top five positions are included for both sets of standings.

References

External links
 

GP2
Monaco
Monaco
Motorsport in Monaco